Charles Chester may refer to:

Charles Chester (cricketer) (1869–1940), English cricketer for Derbyshire
Charles Chester (rugby) (1919–2011), English rugby union and rugby league footballer
Charles Chester of the Chester baronets
Charlie Chester (1914–1997), British comedian and TV and radio presenter
Charles Bagot Chester, MP

See also

Chester (disambiguation)